Festuca hawaiiensis is a species of grass in the family Poaceae. This species is native to Hawaii. Is perennial and prefers montane tropical biomes. Festuca hawaiiensis was first described in 1922.

References

hawaiiensis
Flora of Hawaii
Plants described in 1922